Cophoscincopus simulans is a species of lizard in the family Scincidae. It is found in western Africa.

References

Cophoscincopus
Reptiles described in 1884
Taxa named by Léon Vaillant